Zack Sucher (born October 2, 1986) is an American professional golfer.

Early life
Sucher was born in Atlanta, Georgia, but grew up in Mobile, Alabama. While attending St. Paul's Episcopal School, Sucher helped the men's golf team secure four straight Alabama Class 5A State Titles from 2001 to 2004. Sucher graduated from St. Paul's in 2005 and earned a four-year scholarship to play for the University of Alabama at Birmingham men's golf team.

Professional career

Sucher turned professional in 2009 and played on the NGA Hooters Tour from 2010 to 2012. He played on the Web.com Tour in 2011 and 2013 to 2014. He won his first title in July 2014 at the Midwest Classic. He finished third on the Web.com Tour regular-season money list to earn his PGA Tour card for the 2014–15 season.

Sucher had a slew of injuries in 2017-18 that led to surgery to fix two ligaments and a tendon in his ankle. He returned to the PGA Tour in mid-2019.

On June 22, 2019, Sucher was leading the Travelers Championship by five strokes as he played the 10th hole of the third round. He proceeded to make bogey, double bogey, double bogey. At the same time, Chez Reavie made birdies on Nos. 10, 11, 12, 13 and 15. In a six-hole span, Sucher went from five up to four down. He entered the final round tied for second, six strokes behind Reavie. Sucher finished the tournament tied for second, earning $633,600 and moving to 126th in the season-long FedEx Cup. This concluded a nine-week stretch where Sucher went from being ranked 2045th in the world to 147th.

Amateur wins
2008 Azalea Invitational

Professional wins (1)

Web.com Tour wins (1)

Results in major championships

CUT = missed the half-way cut

See also
2014 Web.com Tour Finals graduates
2016 Web.com Tour Finals graduates

References

External links

American male golfers
UAB Blazers men's golfers
PGA Tour golfers
Korn Ferry Tour graduates
Golfers from Atlanta
1986 births
Living people